Adoxotoma bargo is a jumping spider in the Salticidae family, which is found in New South Wales.

It was described by Marek Michał Żabka in 2001, from a male specimen found in wet sclerophyll forest, under rocks, near Pheasants Nest Bridge, out of Bargo (whence the epithet).

References

External links 

Taxa described in 2001
Salticidae